The Almiri toothcarp or Almiri killifish (Aphanius almiriensis) is a species of pupfish belonging to the family Cyprinodontidae. It can be found in a handful of brackish springs and marshes in the Peloponnese, Greece. Due to one of the springs being dammed up with rocks in the late 1990s to early 2000s, the IUCN considers the fish to be critically endangered on criteria B1ab (i, ii, iii, i, v) and B2ab (i, ii, iii, iv, v); it is possibly extinct at its type locality.

Etymology 
The species name, almiriensis, refers to Almiri, where the fish was originally discovered.

Description 
Like all members of the genus Aphanius, the fish display sexual dimorphism. Female Almiri toothcarp reach a length of approximately 35.1 mm, whereas the males have been recorded to reach up to 28.5 mm.

On their bodies, males have 6–8 dark stripes, which are wider above than below. Their caudal and anal fins are both yellow; the caudal fin also has a grey distal band. The dorsal fin is yellow and has a prominent black margin, with a few dark dots near the base. The anus and genital openings are separated.

Females bear 7–11 roundish blotches on their sides, connected by a dark midlateral stripe.

References 

Aphanius
Fish described in 2007